The Studentenreisproduct is a form of free public transport for students in the Netherlands. Introduced in 1991, the system is a solution for students who don't live near their university or college. The central government intends for this to stimulate teenagers in the development of their education.

Studentenreisproduct is loaded as a product on the OV-chipkaart, a contactless travel card.

Students can choose either free transport on weekdays and a 40% discount on the weekend, or vice versa.

*July 16 16:00 hrs until August 16 16:00 hrs

**Like Friday on the day before Good Friday, before King's Day, before Liberation Day, and before Ascension

References

Transport in the Netherlands
Zero-fare transport services